Visa requirements for Botswana citizens are administrative entry restrictions by the authorities of other states placed on citizens of Botswana. As of 26 July 2022, Botswana citizens had visa-free or visa on arrival access to 83 countries and territories, ranking the Botswana passport 64th in terms of travel freedom according to the Henley Passport Index.

Visa requirements map

Visa requirements

Dependent, disputed, or restricted territories
Unrecognized or partially recognized countries

Dependent and autonomous territories

Non-visa restrictions

See also

Visa policy of Botswana
Botswana passport

References and Notes
References

Notes

Botswana
Foreign relations of Botswana